Hotel Ukraine, also referred to as Hotel Ukraine, was a building located in the center of Chernihiv. Near the hotel are the main post office, shops, banks, ATMs, theater, hairdresser, coffee shop, pharmacy, central market and more.

It was destroyed in 2022.

History
The hotel first opened in 1961.

On March 12, 2022, in the context of the 2022 Russian invasion of Ukraine, a FAB-500 missile, shoot by the Russian army, destroyed the building.

Description
Three-star Hotel Ukraine was located in the center of Chernihiv, 200 meters from the central Krasna Square. The hotel had93 rooms of different categories. Each room is equipped with cable TV, air conditioning, a mini safe and a refrigerator

See also 

 List of hotels in Chernihiv

Gallery

References

External links
 Hotel "Ukraine"—Official site

Hotels in Chernihiv
Hotels built in the Soviet Union
Hotel buildings completed in 1980
Hotels established in 1980
Hotels disestablished in 2022
1980 establishments in Ukraine
2022 disestablishments in Ukraine
Buildings and structures destroyed during the 2022 Russian invasion of Ukraine